Francisco Amaro Rodrigues Adam (13 August 1983 - 16 April 2006) was a Portuguese actor and model, best known for his humorous role as Dino, short for Bernardino Esteves, in the Portuguese youth telenovela Morangos com Açúcar.

Biography
Adam grew up in the village of Runa, near Torres Vedras.  At the age of 18, he moved to Lisbon to become a model, first for Elite Models and later for On Fashion. After 4 years of working for fashion and advertisement campaigns, Adam was cast in Morangos com Açúcar. He had a considerable following on the Internet, mostly from Portuguese teenage girls, who nicknamed him the Dino-man.

Death
Adam died in a car accident near Alcochete, at 03:50 UTC on 16 April 2006 (Easter Sunday), at the age of 22, after an autograph signing session at a nightclub in Coruche.

According to TVI, Adam was supposed to become the central character in Morangos com Açúcar in the following season.

References

External links

1983 births
2006 deaths
Male actors from Lisbon
Portuguese male television actors
Portuguese people of British descent
Road incident deaths in Portugal